Acacia Bandubola Mbongo, (née Acacia Bandubola), is a Congolese businesswoman and politician, who serves as the Minister of the National Economy in the Cabinet of the Democratic Republic of the Congo, since 26 August 2019.

Background and education
Bandubola was born in the city of Kisangani, to Henriette Mbokoso Bokwetenge and Raphael Bandubola. She attended CS Okapi, a private school in Kisangani, where her parents lived at the time. In 1994, Acacia Bandubola relocated to Kinshasa, the capital and largest city in the country. She continued her studies at Lycée Bosangani from 1994 until 1999. In 2000, she graduated with a State School Diploma from Lycée Molière. She holds a Bachelor of Business Administration from the Protestant University in the Congo.

Career

In business
Bandubola has worked for Ecobank, FINCA, Banque Internationale pour l'Afrique au Congo (BIAC), and Vodacom. She also worked at a private economic consultancy firm in France.

In politics
Bandubola began her political activism as a student, in opposition to the oppressive policies of Mobutu Sese Seko. She belonged and supported several political parties while in the Democratic Republic of the Congo, including Envol and RNS.

While working in France, she was introduced to the ideology of Étienne Tshisekedi and joined the Union for Democracy and Social Progress (Democratic Republic of the Congo) (UDPS) political party. She became a vocal supporter of UDPS on many media outlets (radio and television) in the West. In the cabinet announced on 29 August 2019, she was appointed as the Minister of National Economy, replacing Joseph Kapika, who served in that position from April 2017, until August 2019.

As minister, she condemns the practice of some businesses in the DRC, raising prices of staple consumables, including corn flour, sugar and rice, due to the Coronavirus scare. She recommends that government, businesses and the public should work together to maintain price stability during the pandemic. Short of that, she recommends that government should fix commodity prices, when businesses engage in price gouging.

Family
Acacia Bandubola Mbongo is a married mother.

See also
 Félix Tshisekedi
 Ève Bazaiba

References

External links
  DRC: Minister of Economy files complaint against Internet users for “attack” on her honor (Translated from the original French Language) As of 11 March 2020.

Living people
People from Kisangani
Year of birth missing (living people)
Democratic Republic of the Congo businesspeople
Democratic Republic of the Congo women
Government ministers of the Democratic Republic of the Congo
Women government ministers of the Democratic Republic of the Congo
Democratic Republic of the Congo women in business
Protestant University in the Congo alumni
21st-century Democratic Republic of the Congo people
21st-century Democratic Republic of the Congo women politicians
21st-century Democratic Republic of the Congo politicians